Allium cernuum, known as nodding onion or lady's leek, is a perennial plant in the genus Allium. It grows in open areas in North America.

Description
Allium cernuum is a herbaceous perennial growing from an unsheathed elongated conical bulb which gradually tapers directly into several keeled (thin and flat) grass-like leaves,  in width. Each mature bulb bears a single flowering stem, which terminates in a downward nodding umbel of white or rose, campanulate (bell-shaped) flowers that bloom in July and August. A. cernuum does not have bulblets in the inflorescence. The flowers mature into spherical crested fruits which later split open to reveal the dark shiny seeds.

Similar species 
In addition to other species of Allium, wild garlic, field garlic, and wild leek look similar. Any onion-like plant which lacks the expected odor should be suspect of being a similar-looking poisonous species, namely deathcamas.

Distribution and habitat
The species has been reported from much of the United States, Canada and Mexico including in the Appalachian Mountains from Alabama to New York State, the Great Lakes Region, the Ohio and Tennessee River Valleys, the Ozarks of Arkansas and Missouri, and the Rocky and Cascade Mountains of the West, from Mexico to Washington. It has not been reported from California, Nevada, Florida, Louisiana, Mississippi, New Jersey, Delaware, New England, or much of the Great Plains. In Canada, it grows from Ontario to British Columbia.

Despite its wide geographical distribution, it is absent from much of its range. In the southern part of its range in North America it is limited to mountainous habitats, and in other parts of its North American range it is limited to local and disjunct population.  It is absent from North Dakota and most of the Great Plains states and intermountain region of the U.S. In Minnesota it is listed as a threatened species.

It can be found growing in deciduous woodlands, to open grasslands.

Uses
Although it is important to distinguish from poisonous deathcamas, the plant is edible and has a strong onion flavor, often used in cooking.

It is grown in gardens for its distinctive nodding flowers that are white, pink, or maroon; it is winter hardy in U.S. Department of Agriculture hardiness zones 3–9.

References

External links
 
 

cernuum
Flora of Canada
Flora of the United States
Flora of Mexico
Onions
Flora of Missouri
Plants described in 1798
Flora without expected TNC conservation status